Henry Adolphus London House is a historic home located at Pittsboro, Chatham County, North Carolina.  It was built about 1895, is a one-story, three bay Queen Anne style frame cottage. It features a wraparound porch, projecting bay, and decorative wood shingles.  Also on the property is a contributing two-story barn.

It was listed on the National Register of Historic Places in 1998.

References

Houses on the National Register of Historic Places in North Carolina
Queen Anne architecture in North Carolina
Houses completed in 1895
Houses in Chatham County, North Carolina
National Register of Historic Places in Chatham County, North Carolina
Pittsboro, North Carolina